Abla is both a given name and a surname. Notable people with the name include:

People with the given name
Maureen Abla Amematekpor (born 1954), Ghanaian diplomat
Abla Farhoud (born 1945), Lebanese-born Canadian writer
Abla Kamel (born 1960), Egyptian actress
Abla Khairy, Egyptian swimmer
Abla Mehio Sibai, Lebanese professor
Lalla Abla bint Tahar, Moroccan princess

People with the surname
Diana Abla (born 1995), Brazilian water polo player
Mohamed Abla (born 1953), Egyptian artist

Arabic feminine given names